Cania is a locality in the North Burnett Region, Queensland, Australia.

The locality includes Cania Gorge National Park and Cania Dam.

History 
Cania Provisional School opened in 1890. It became Cania State School on 1 January 1909. Due to low attendance numbers, it closed in 1930.

References 

North Burnett Region
Localities in Queensland